Oxynooidea is a superfamily of small sea snails, bubble snails and bivalved gastropods, marine gastropod mollusks within the superorder Sacoglossa.

Families
Families within the superfamily Oxynooidea:
 family Cylindrobullidae Thiele, 1931
 family Juliidae  E. A. Smith, 1885
 family Oxynoidae Stoliczka, 1868 (1847)
 family Volvatellidae Pilsbry, 1895

References

 Jensen, R. H. (1997). A Checklist and Bibliography of the Marine Molluscs of Bermuda. Unp. , 547 pp
 Bouchet P., Rocroi J.P., Hausdorf B., Kaim A., Kano Y., Nützel A., Parkhaev P., Schrödl M. & Strong E.E. (2017). Revised classification, nomenclator and typification of gastropod and monoplacophoran families. Malacologia. 61(1-2): 1-526

Panpulmonata
Gastropod superfamilies